Bathtub liners also known as tub liners, acrylic tub liners and  tub inserts are made by vacuum forming an acrylic or PVC (poly vinyl chloride) sheet which is heated then formed in a mold by applying vacuum. Having the proper mold is important for the tub liner to fit properly.  Typically a bathtub liner will fall between the cost of replacing a bathtub at the high end and bathtub refinishing at the lower end in cost when renovating a damaged or outdated bathtub.

See also
 Bathtub Refinishing
 Bathroom
 Bathtub
 Home improvement
 Home repair
 Hot tub
 Jacuzzi
 Shower

References

Bathing
Bathrooms